Stony Lake is a lake in Hubbard County, in the U.S. state of Minnesota.

Stony Lake was named for its rocky shore.

See also
List of lakes in Minnesota

References

Lakes of Minnesota
Lakes of Hubbard County, Minnesota